Loneliness Knows My Name is the full-length debut LP by singer-songwriter Patrick Park, released in 2003. Some of the songs have achieved popular status through their use on the television programme The O.C..

Track listing
"Thunderbolt" – 2:56
"Honest Skrew" – 2:58
"Sons of Guns" – 3:47
"Nothing's Wrong" – 3:38
"Your Smile's a Drug" - 3:32
"Something Pretty" - 3:14
"Silver Girl" - 3:34
"Desperation Eyes" - 3:01
"Past Poisons" - 4:30
"Bullets by the Door" - 3:26
"Home for Now" - 2:42

External links
Patrick Park

2003 debut albums
Patrick Park albums